Guest at One's Own Home (Swedish: Gäst i eget hus) is a 1957 Swedish drama film directed by Stig Olin and starring Anita Björk, Lars Ekborg and Alf Kjellin. It was shot at the Centrumateljéerna Studios in Stockholm and on location around the city. The film's sets were designed by the art director Nils Nilsson.

Cast
 Anita Björk as Eva Dahl
 Lars Ekborg as 	Boy Lannert
 Alf Kjellin as 	Age Dahl
 Isa Quensel as 	Stepmother
 Holger Löwenadler as 	Fredik Lannert
 Monica Nielsen as 	Berit
 Barbro Hiort af Ornäs as 	Lisen
 Claes Thelander as Sten, Doctor
 Aino Taube as 	Mrs. Brecker
 Birgitta Andersson as 	Guest 
 Sten Ardenstam as 	Guest 
 Sven Arvor as Waiter 
 Tom Dan-Bergman as 	Guest
 Elsa Ebbesen as 	Mrs. Bergström 
 Sten Gester as Guest 
 Anne Marie Machnow as 	Guest 
 Karin Miller as 	Nurse 
 Gösta Prüzelius as Doctor 
 Astrid Söderbaum as 	Maid

References

Bibliography 
 Qvist, Per Olov & von Bagh, Peter. Guide to the Cinema of Sweden and Finland. Greenwood Publishing Group, 2000.

External links 
 

1957 films
Swedish drama films
1957 drama films
1950s Swedish-language films
Films directed by Stig Olin
Swedish black-and-white films
1950s Swedish films